The women's sprint at the 2002 Commonwealth Games was part of the cycling programme, which took place on 31 July and 1 August 2002.

Records
Prior to this competition, the existing world and Games records were as follows:

Schedule
The schedule is as follows:

Results

Qualifying
All riders will be seeded for the quarterfinals according to their times in qualification.

Quarter-finals

Heat 1

 Heat 3

Heat 2

5th–6th place classifications

Semifinals

Heat 1

Heat 2

Bronze medal match

Gold medal match

References

Women's sprint
Cycling at the Commonwealth Games – Women's sprint
Comm